LEMS may refer to:
 Landstuhl Elementary Middle School, an American international school in Germany 
 Lambert–Eaton myasthenic syndrome, results in muscle weakness 
 The Lems electric car manufactured by the London Electromobile Syndicate